Gender-affirming surgery for male-to-female transgender women or transfeminine non-binary people describes a variety of surgical procedures that alter the body to provide physical traits more comfortable and affirming to an individual's gender identity and overall functioning.

Often used to refer to vaginoplasty, sex reassignment surgery can also more broadly refer to other gender-affirming procedures an individual may have, such as permanent reduction or removal of body or facial hair through laser hair removal or electrolysis, facial feminization surgery, tracheal shave, vulvoplasty, orchiectomy, voice surgery, or breast augmentation.

Sex reassignment surgery is usually preceded by beginning feminizing hormone therapy. Some surgeries can reduce the need for hormone therapy.

Genital surgery
There are a variety of genital surgeries available to trans women and transfeminine non-binary people. Genital surgery can be an effective way for an individual to ease or eliminate feelings of disconnection or discomfort with their natal genitals; for others, including those who do not feel strongly about their natal genitals, it can create feelings of connection or congruence with their genitals post-surgery. Following the removal of the testicles, the human body produces very little testosterone. This can reduce the need to take supplemental estrogen medication and eliminates the need to take antiandrogen medication.

Vaginoplasty 

Vaginoplasty is the process of constructing a neovagina and neovulva from existing genital or abdominal tissue. There are multiple techniques for performing vaginoplasty. Sexual sensation is typically retained following surgery, and the self-reported rate of personal satisfaction with surgical results across different vaginoplasty techniques is very high.

Penile inversion 
Penile inversion is a common vaginoplasty technique. The testicles and scrotum are removed and the glans of the penis made into a clitoris. A canal is surgically created between the bladder and the rectum. The foreskin of the penis is inverted to form the interior walls of the neovagina. If the patient had been circumcised before surgery, skin from the scrotum may also be used to construct the walls of the neovagina after cauterising the hair follicles. The urethra is shortened, and the mons pubis, labia majora and minora, and urethral opening are created using scrotal and urethral tissue.

Because this technique inverts the skin of the penis to form the walls of the neovagina, post-operative depth is limited by the length of the penis prior to surgery. Following surgery, a patient will need to dilate the neovagina with a vaginal dilator 1-2 times daily to prevent loss of vaginal depth. The need to dilate becomes less frequent with time, but is recommended at least once a week after the neovagina has healed completely. Having penetrative sex can affect the amount of dilation needed, but additional lubricant is required during penetrative sex as the neovagina created through penile inversion vaginoplasty is not self-lubricating.

Bowel vaginoplasty 
Bowel vaginoplasty is another common vaginoplasty technique. It is also utilised for vaginoplasty in cisgender women. As with penile inversion vaginoplasty, the testicles and scrotum are removed, the glans made into a clitoris, and the neovulva constructed from scrotal and urethral tissue. However, in bowel vaginoplasty a segment of rectosigmoid colon is grafted into a surgically created canal to form the walls of the neovagina.

As bowel vaginoplasty uses colon to construct the neovagina, post-operative depth is not dependent on the length of the penis prior to surgery. This makes it appropriate for individuals who have already undergone penectomy, orchiectomy, or who had a penis smaller than the desired depth of the neovagina prior to surgery. Unlike penile inversion vaginoplasty, the neovagina created through bowel vaginoplasty is self-lubricating and does not require further dilation once fully healed.

Vulvoplasty 
Vulvoplasty is the process of constructing a neovulva from existing genital tissue. The testicles, scrotum, and penis are removed, and the glans made into a clitoris. The urethra is shortened, and the mons pubis, labia majora and minora, and urethral opening are created using scrotal and urethral tissue. Unlike vaginoplasty, a neovagina is not created.

Because vulvoplasty does not create a neovagina, it is appropriate for individuals who do not wish to have vaginal sex following surgery or who are not interested in the increased aftercare routine of vaginoplasty.

Orchiectomy 
Orchiectomy is the process of removing the testicles from the body. It can be performed with or without removing the scrotum. An incision is made in the middle of the scrotum and the spermatic cord stitched to prevent excessive bleeding. The testicles are then removed through the incision.

An individual who undergoes an orchiectomy will produce very little testosterone due to the removal of their testicles. This natural reduction in testosterone eliminates the need to take antiandrogen medication, which in turn can reduce the need to take supplemental estrogen medication.

Other related procedures

Facial feminization surgery

Occasionally these basic procedures are complemented further with feminizing cosmetic surgeries or procedures that modify bone or cartilage structures, typically in the jaw, brow, forehead, nose and cheek areas. These are known as facial feminization surgery or FFS.

Breast augmentation
Breast augmentation is the enlargement of the breasts. Some trans women choose to undergo this procedure if hormone therapy does not yield satisfactory results. Usually, typical growth for trans women is one to two cup sizes below closely related females such as the mother or sisters. Oestrogen is responsible for fat distribution to the breasts, hips and buttocks, while progesterone is responsible for developing the actual milk glands. Progesterone also rounds out the breast to an adult Tanner stage-5 shape and matures and darkens the areola.

Voice feminization surgery

Some MTF individuals may elect to have voice surgery, which alters an individual's vocal range or pitch. However, this procedure carries a risk of impairing a trans woman's voice forever. Since estrogen alone does not alter a person's vocal range or pitch, some people take the risk that comes along with voice feminization surgery. Other options, like voice feminization lessons, are available to people wishing to speak with less masculine mannerisms.

Tracheal shave

A tracheal shave procedure is also sometimes used to reduce the cartilage in the area of the throat and minimize the appearance of the Adam's apple in order to assimilate to female physical features.

Buttock augmentation
Some MTF individuals will choose to undergo buttock augmentation because anatomically, male hips and buttocks are generally smaller than those presented on a female. If, however, efficient hormone therapy is conducted before the patient is past puberty, the pelvis will broaden slightly, and even if the patient is past their teen years, a layer of subcutaneous fat will be distributed over the body, rounding contours. Trans women usually end up with a waist to hip ratio of around 0.8, and if estrogen is administered at a young enough age "before the bone plates close", some trans women may achieve a waist to hip ratio of 0.7 or lower. The pubescent pelvis will broaden under estrogen therapy even if the skeleton is anatomically masculine.

History 
Lili Elbe was the first well-known recipient of male-to-female sex reassignment surgery, in Germany in 1930, the first being Dora Richter. She was the subject of four surgeries: one for orchiectomy, one to transplant an ovary, one for penectomy, and one for vaginoplasty and a uterus transplant. However, she died three months after her last operation.

Christine Jorgensen was likely the most famous recipient of sex reassignment surgery, having her surgery done in Denmark in late 1952 and being outed right afterwards. She was a strong advocate for the rights of transgender people.

French actress and singer Coccinelle travelled to Casablanca in 1958 to undergo a vaginoplasty by Georges Burou. She said later, "Dr Burou rectified the mistake nature had made and I became a real woman, on the inside as well as the outside. After the operation, the doctor just said, 'Bonjour, Mademoiselle', and I knew it had been a success."

Another famous person to undergo male-to-female sex reassignment surgery was Renée Richards. She transitioned and had surgery in the mid-1970s, and successfully advocated to have transgender people recognized in U.S sports.

The first physician to perform sex reassignment surgery in the United States was Los Angeles-based urologist Dr. Elmer Belt, who quietly performed operations from the early 1950s until 1968. In 1966, Johns Hopkins University opened the first sex reassignment surgery clinic in America. The Hopkins Gender Identity Clinic was made up of two plastic surgeons, two psychiatrists, two psychologists, a gynecologist, a urologist, and a pediatrician.

In 1997, Sergeant Sylvia Durand became the first serving member of the Canadian Forces to transition from male to female, and became the first member of any military worldwide to transition openly while serving under the Flag. On Canada Day of 1998, the military changed her legal name to Sylvia and changed her sex designation on all of her personal file documents. In 1999, the military paid for her sex reassignment surgery. Durand continued to serve and was promoted to the rank of Warrant Officer. When she retired in 2012, after more than 31 years of service, she was the assistant to the Canadian Forces Chief Communications Operator.

In 2017, for the first time, the United States Defense Health Agency approved payment for sex reassignment surgery for an active-duty U.S. military service member. The patient, an infantry soldier who identifies as a woman, had already begun a course of treatment for gender reassignment. The procedure, which the treating doctor deemed medically necessary, was performed on November 14 at a private hospital, since U.S. military hospitals lack the requisite surgical expertise.

See also 

 List of transgender-related topics
 Sex reassignment surgery
 Sex reassignment surgery (female-to-male)
 Uterus transplantation

References 

 
Surgical procedures and techniques